Harkmark is a village in Lindesnes municipality in Agder county, Norway. The village is the site of the Harkmark Church which is where the Harkmark parish is based, and the namesake of the old municipality of Halse og Harkmark which existed from 1838 until 1964.

References

Villages in Agder
Lindesnes